Sandy Bar is a small town located on Lake Winnipeg in Manitoba, Canada.

History
Sandy Bar was founded in the 1870s. It was hit by a severe out break of smallpox brought by Icelandic settlers who settled at Gimli. The first and only clerk and secretary appointed to serve the council was F.G. Becher.

References 

Unincorporated communities in Manitoba